The sack of Chernigov occurred during the western campaign of the Mongols between 1235-1242, it was part of the 1237-1242 Mongol invasion of Russia. The siege and capture of the capital of the Chernigov Principality by the Mongols occurred on October 18, 1239.

Location 
The majority of the Principality of Chernigov was located on the left bank of the Dnieper River, within the basins of the Desna and Seym rivers. The principality was populated mostly by Slavic tribes of Siverians and partially by the Dnieper Polans. The territory of the principality later extended to the lands of the Radimichs and part of the lands of the Vyatichs and Drehovichs. Chernigov was the capital city, other large cities included Novgorod-Seversky, Starodub-Seversky, Trubchevsk and Kozelsk. Ownership and influence of the Chernigov Principality bordered on Murom-Ryazan Land to the north and Tmutorokan Principality to the southeast.

Prelude 
The Mongol invasion of Rus' took place in two phases. During the winter of 1237-38, the Mongols conquered the northern Rus' territories (the principalities of Ryazan and Vladimir-Suzdal) with the exception of the Novgorod Republic, and then in the spring of 1238 they retreated back to the Wild Fields. In 1239 the second campaign aimed at the southern Rus' territories (the principalities of Chernigov and Kiev).

Battle 
In the autumn of 1239, the Tatar horde captured Hlukhiv, Kursk, Rylsk, and Putivl, and advanced towards Chernigov. When Prince Mstislav heard that the Tatars were attacking the town, he moved with his troops to confront them. The nomads used catapults that hurled stones the distance of a bowshot and a half. Mstislav escaped, but many of his men were killed.

Aftermath 
Following the fall of Chernigov on October 18, 1239 the Tatars pillaged towns in the surrounding countryside. The capital city of Kiev fell in autumn of 1240. The Principality of Chernigov was dissolved after the Mongol invasion.

References 

Sieges involving the Mongol Empire
Battles of the Mongol invasion of Kievan Rus'
History of Chernihiv
1239 in Europe
Conflicts in 1239
13th century in Russia
1239 in the Mongol Empire
Looting